Ozyornoye (Kara-Suu) is a rural locality (a selo) in Ust-Kansky District, the Altai Republic, Russia. The population was 172 as of 2016. There are 3 streets.

Geography 
Ozyornoye is located 9 km north of Ust-Kan (the district's administrative centre) by road. Ust-Kan and Kozul are the nearest rural localities.

References 

Rural localities in Ust-Kansky District